Events from the year 1998 in Sweden

Incumbents
 Monarch – Carl XVI Gustaf
 Prime Minister – Göran Persson

Events
1 January – Västra Götaland County is founded following a merger of the counties of Älvsborg, Göteborg and Bohus, and Skaraborg Counties.

September
 20 September – The 1998 Swedish general election.

Popular culture

Literature
Date unknown: Berömda män som varit i Sunne, novel by Göran Tunström, winner of the August Prize.

Music
 21 October – Blott en dag, music album released by Carola Häggkvist

Sports 
7–22 February: 99 sportspersons compete for Sweden at the 1998 Winter Olympics.
8 November:  The 1998 Allsvenskan is won by AIK.

Births
 29 May – Matilda Algotsson, figure skater
 15 October – Jonna Luthman, alpine ski racer.
 30 October – Jesper Boqvist, Swedish ice hockey player
 15 November – Emma Larsson, artistic gymnast

Deaths

 1 January – Åke Seyffarth, speed skater (born 1919).
 6 January – Märta Johansson, diver (born 1907).
 21 May – Erik Bladström, canoer, Olympic champion 1936 (born 1918).
 1 December – Bertil Nordahl, footballer (born 1917).

Full date missing
 Birger Sandberg, footballer (born 1918)

References

 
Years of the 20th century in Sweden
Sweden
1990s in Sweden
Sweden